Vesa Leppänen (born ) is a Finnish wheelchair curler.

He participated in the 2018 Winter Paralympics where Finnish team finished on eleventh place.

Teams

References

External links 

 Video: 

Living people
1951 births
Finnish male curlers
Finnish wheelchair curlers
Paralympic wheelchair curlers of Finland
Wheelchair curlers at the 2018 Winter Paralympics
Finnish wheelchair curling champions
21st-century Finnish people